Forever is the second studio album by American country music singer John Conlee. It was released in 1979 by MCA Records.

Track listing

Charts

References

1979 albums
John Conlee albums
MCA Records albums